Stadio Diego Armando Maradona, formerly known as Stadio San Paolo, is a stadium in the western Fuorigrotta suburb of Naples, Italy. It is the fourth largest football stadium in Italy, after Milan's San Siro, Rome's Stadio Olimpico and Bari's San Nicola. For the 1960 Summer Olympics in Rome, the stadium hosted the football preliminaries. It is currently used mostly for football matches and is the home stadium of S.S.C. Napoli. Constructed in 1959, the stadium was extensively renovated in 1989 for the 1990 World Cup and again in 2018. The stadium currently accommodates 60,240 spectators, but in the past with terraced sections, the stadium took close to 90,000.

History

Even though Napoli was in the Serie C1 during the 2005–06 season, Napoli achieved the feat of having the 3rd highest average home attendance in Italy for the season, with only two Serie A clubs, Milan and Internazionale recording higher attendances. Napoli's final game of the season drew a crowd of 51,000 which now stands as a Serie C all-time record.

The stadium also hosted Italy's Euro 2008 qualifier against Lithuania on 2 September 2006.

The stadium was renovated in preparation for the 2019 Summer Universiade; this included replacing metal fencing with glass barriers and replacing seats. This means the stadium's capacity was reduced from 60,240 to 54,726. The stadium hosted the opening ceremony and athletics event.

Following the death of former Napoli player Diego Maradona on 25 November 2020, the city's mayor Luigi de Magistris and Napoli president Aurelio De Laurentiis proposed renaming the stadium "Stadio Diego Armando Maradona", and on 4 December 2020, the proposal was passed by the City Council.

Events

1990 FIFA World Cup

The stadium was one of the venues of the 1990 FIFA World Cup, and held five matches. The first two were Argentina’s Group B matches: the first was against Soviet Union on 13 June winning 2-0, and the second was against Romania on 18 June ending in a 1-1 draw. The next two were Cameroon matches: the first was a Round of 16 match against Colombia on 23 June winning 2-1 after extra time, and the second was a Quarter-finals match against England on 1 July losing 3-2 after extra time.

The fifth and last was the semi-final between Argentina and Italy on 3 July. Argentina's superstar Diego Maradona, who played for Naples's Italian 1st division team and was a hero to their supporters, asked Napoli fans to cheer for Argentina. The Napoli tifosi responded by hanging a giant flag in their "curva" of the stadium saying "Maradona, Naples loves you, but Italy is our homeland".  Maradona later said he was touched that Napoli was the only stadium during that World Cup where the Argentinian national anthem was not jeered. The match finished 1–1 after extra time. A penalty shootout ensued, with Maradona fittingly scoring the winning penalty for Argentina.

References

External links
Stadio San Paolo Virtual Tour
Stadium Guide Article
1960 Summer Olympics official report. Volume 1. p. 86.

San Paolo
San
Sport in Naples
S.S.C. Napoli
1990 FIFA World Cup stadiums
Sports venues completed in 1959
Venues of the 1960 Summer Olympics
Olympic football venues
Multi-purpose stadiums in Italy
UEFA Euro 1968 stadiums
Sports venues in Naples
UEFA Euro 1980 stadiums
1959 establishments in Italy
Diamond League venues